San Rafael Municipality may refer to:
 San Rafael Municipality, Santa Cruz, Bolivia
 San Rafael, Antioquia, Colombia
 San Rafael Municipality, Lempira, surrounding San Rafael, Lempira, Honduras
 San Rafael Municipality, Veracruz, Mexico

Municipality name disambiguation pages